Meleh Kabud-e Sofla (also Romanized as Meleh Kabūd-e Soflá) is a village in Kakavand-e Sharqi Rural District, Kakavand District, Delfan County, Lorestan Province, Iran. In accordance with the 2006 census, its population was 45, in 11 families.

References 

Towns and villages in Delfan County